Rainbow Boulevard may refer to:
Rainbow Boulevard (Kansas City)
Rainbow Boulevard (Las Vegas)
Rainbow Boulevard in Niagara Falls, New York, formerly part of New York State Route 384
A portion of U.S. Route 169 in Kansas

See also
 Rainbow Street
 Rainbow Route
 Rainbow Road (disambiguation)
 Rainbow Row
 Rainbow Circle